Michal Šmoldas (born 8 June 1998) is a Czech male canoeist who was 8th in the C1 sprint senior final at the 2016 Wildwater Canoeing World Championships.

Achievements

References

External links
 

1998 births
Living people
Czech male canoeists
Place of birth missing (living people)